Christopher James Coyne (born June 17, 1958) is an American prelate of the Roman Catholic Church. Since 2015, he has been bishop of the Diocese of Burlington in Vermont.  Coyne previously served as an auxiliary bishop of the Archdiocese of Indianapolis in Indiana from 2011 to 2015.

Biography

Early life and education 
Christopher Coyne was born on June 17, 1958, in Woburn, Massachusetts to Rita and Bill Coyne. He attended public schools in Woburn, graduating from Woburn Memorial High School in 1976. In 1980, Coyne received a Bachelor of Business Administration degree from University of Massachusetts Lowell in Lowell, Massachusetts.  For two years after graduation, Coyne worked as a bartender. In 1986. Coyne graduated with a Master of Divinity degree from St. John's Seminary in Boston.

Priesthood 
On June 7, 1986, Coyne was ordained into the priesthood for the Archdiocese of Boston by Cardinal Bernard Law. Coyne's first assignment after ordination in 1986 was as parochial vicar for St. Mary of the Hills Parish in Milton, Massachusetts, staying there until 1989. In 1992, he earned his Licentiate in Sacred Theology and in 1994 his Doctor of Sacred Liturgy degree from the Pontifical Liturgical Institute in Rome. In 1994, Coyne was appointed director of the pre-theology program at St. John's Seminary. In 2004, he became an adjunct faculty member there. Coyne became director in 2000 for the Office of Worship for the archdiocese.

In 2002, Coyne became cabinet secretary for communications and archdiocesan spokesman in the middle of the sex abuse scandal in the archdiocese.  According to Coyne, he turned down Archbishop Law's offer twice.  On accepting the job, Coyne said he told Law that he would not lie or disparage victims and wanted full access to archdiocese records.

In 2002, Coyne was appointed pastor of Our Lady Help of Christians Parish in Newton, Massachusetts.  His appointment raised controversy in the parish because Coyne had been the archdiocesan spokesman under Law, who had replaced a former pastor for speaking out against him.  On February 1, 2003, after serving four months in Our Lady, Coyne requested a transfer to another parish from Archbishop Sean O'Malley. In 2006, O'Malley transferred Coyne to Saint Margaret Mary Parish in Westwood, Massachusetts

Auxiliary Bishop of Indianapolis 
In January 2011, Pope Benedict XVI named Coyne as an auxiliary bishop for the Archdiocese of Indianapolis and titular bishop of Mopta. On March 2, 2011, he was consecrated in St. John the Evangelist Church in Indianapolis. Coyne was the first auxiliary bishop in the archdiocese since 1933. Also in March 2011, Coyne was named vicar general, a post he would hold until 2016.

On September 21, 2011, Coyne was appointed the apostolic administrator for the archdiocese by Benedict XVI.  This was due to the early retirement of Archbishop Daniel Buechlein due to ill health. Coyne served as apostolic administrator until the installation of Archbishop Joseph Tobin in 2012.  In November 2014, Coyne was elected chair of the Committee on Communication of the United States Conference of Catholic Bishops (USCCB).

Bishop of Burlington
On December 22, 2014, Pope Francis named Coyne as Bishop of the Diocese of Burlington. His installation occurred on January 29, 2015.

On September 28, 2016, Coyne waived the non-disclosure agreements for all sexual abuse victims from St. Joseph's Orphanage in Burlington who had settled lawsuits against the diocese. He said that he wanted these victims to tell their abuse stories without fear of being sued. On December 17, 2020, Coyne apologized to the victims after the release of an investigative report by the State of Vermont that verified sexual abuse crimes at St. Joseph's.  Coyne remarked:I absolutely believe that children were abused at the orphanage. No one is contesting that at all. Any victim of abuse at the hands of clergy of the church is an awful thing and I can’t apologize enough.

See also

 Catholic Church hierarchy
 Catholic Church in the United States
 Historical list of the Catholic bishops of the United States
 List of Catholic bishops of the United States
 Lists of patriarchs, archbishops, and bishops

References

External links

 Diocese of Burlington
 Diocese of Burlington information page on Bishop Coyne
 Bishop Coyne's blog

}

 
 

1958 births
Living people
People from Woburn, Massachusetts
Pontifical North American College alumni
Pontifical Atheneum of St. Anselm alumni
21st-century Roman Catholic bishops in the United States
Roman Catholic Archdiocese of Indianapolis
Roman Catholic bishops of Burlington
Catholics from Massachusetts